Documentary Channel may refer to:

 Documentary Channel (American TV channel), a former U.S. network
 Documentary Channel (Canadian TV channel), stylized as documentary Channel
 Documentary Channel (New Zealand TV channel)
 Al Jazeera Documentary Channel, Qatar
 RT Documentary, Russia
 CGTN Documentary, China
 Zee Documentary, known as Documentary TV India

See also
Documentary channel
List of documentary television channels
Documentary (disambiguation)